Sofia Vokalensemble (often abbreviated as SOVE) is a mixed chamber choir based in the Sofia Church in the Sofia parish in Stockholm, Sweden. The choir in its present form was founded in 1995 by conductor Bengt Ollén who still leads the artistic work.

In 2012 Sofia Vokalensemble won the 24th European Grand Prix for Choral Singing in Maribor, Slovenia, competing in the final against four other winners of major 2011 international choral competitions. In 2015 Sveriges Radio, the Swedish public-broadcasting system that frequently records and broadcasts Sofia Vokalensemble's performances, appointed the choir as Sweden's representative in Let the Peoples Sing (LTPS), an international choir competition organized by the European Broadcasting Union (EBU).

The choir

Organization
Sofia Vokalensemble performs both within the framework of the parish's work and in collaboration with external partners. The choir is a non-profit organization with bi-annual General Meetings and a Board of Directors. Most of the 32 singers started singing in choirs before the age of 10 and are now between 20 and 40 years old; many have received their choral and music training at Adolf Fredrik's School of Music, Stockholms Musikgymnasium, Södra Latin and/or other music institutions in the Stockholm region.

Repertoire
The repertoire consists of both new and old choral music, such as works by Bach, Mahler, Poulenc, Pärt och Schnittke. The choir has performed world premieres by the established Swedish composers Fredrik Sixten, Stefan Klaverdal and Karin Rehnqvist, Swedish soprano saxophonist Anders Paulsson, Norwegian composer Ola Gjeilo and Finnish composer Jaakko Mäntyjärvi, as well as "rising stars" such as Jacob Mühlrad and some of the choir's own members.

Choral work

The working style is collaborative. The choir members all help out with the choice of repertoire, musical scores, food and drink, marketing och stage costumes. Rehearsals are usually one evening per week and the choir meets for a weekend retreat at an external location about twice per year. Sometimes massage is included in the warmup for practice. During rehearsals, Bengt Ollén works actively with the voices and challenges the choir members to sing without the score. To foster security and trust between choir members they practice singing in small groups, eye to eye, ear to ear or with varying temperamental expressions and improvisations.

For each new concert or tour, a project leader is appointed, drawn from the members of the choir. During tours each new hotel means new roommates. "Secret buddies" are drawn by lottery so that each choir member must take extra care of the person whose name appears on the lottery ticket. Says one choir member: "Above all we try to be kind to each other".

Over the years Sofia Vokalensemble has often been invited to present their working method at international workshops, and the choir is host to visiting foreign choir leaders who wish to follow the rehearsal work. Says Ollén: "The vision is to create music beyond the score. The music performed by the choir should not be just beautiful tones and neat musical interpretation. The music must also affect the listener. Therefore each singer is an important part of the musical work".

International tours and competitions
Sofia Vokalensemble has toured extensively both in Sweden and abroad. The following is a list of the choir's international tours:

Other noteworthy events
 1995: Bengt Ollén founded the choir
 2011: Represented Sweden as far as the semifinal in the choir competition Let the Peoples Sing, arranged by the European Broadcasting Union (EBU)
 2014: Selected by the International Federation for Choral Music as IFCM ambassador for a period of three years and invited to participate in the 2014 10th World Symposium on Choral Music in South Korea.
 2015: Represented Sweden in final of the choir competition Let the Peoples Sing, arranged by the European Broadcasting Union (EBU)

Discography and broadcasts
Sofia Vokalensemble has recorded the following CDs:

2003: Black against white sky with music by i.a. Frank Martin and Eric Whitacre, Skivbolaget Silas Bäckström Produktion, BEF - 4806.
2009: The Darkness is No Darkness has a focus on contemporary American and British choral music, including four of James MacMillan's Strathclyde motets and Herbert Howells' Requiem, Footprint Records, FRCD047
2011: A Spotless Rose - Nordic Christmas contains Christmas music by Norwegian and Swedish composers with a mix of classical tunes and more contemporary works, Footprint Records, FRCD060
2012: Ett Svenskt Juloratorium (English: A Swedish Christmas Oratorio) where Sofia Vokalensemble has recorded a new oratorio by the Swedish composer Fredrik Sixten, Footprint Records, FRCD069
2014: Förvårskväll - One early spring evening contains Swedish and Nordic music where Swedish classical choral lyrics are mixed with modern compositions, Convivium Records, CR017 – includes the folk song Trilo
2019: In Paradisum contains Sofia Vokalensemble's "favourite and most frequently performed composers in pieces that depict perceived divinity", Footprint Records, FRCD112

As of October 2021 the choir had participated in nine television and 200 radio broadcasts that are on file at the Swedish Media Database, a search service for the audiovisual collections at the National Library of Sweden. The files include live radio broadcasts through the European Broadcasting Union.

References

Notes

External links
  
 Video on YouTube

1995 establishments in Sweden
Musical groups established in 1995
Chamber choirs
Swedish choirs
Bach choirs
Organizations based in Stockholm
Music in Stockholm